Mirrool Creek, a watercourse that is part of the Lachlan sub-catchment of the Murrumbidgee catchment in the Murray–Darling basin, is in the Riverina region of New South Wales, Australia. The course of the Mirrool Creek is indefinite at various locations.

Course and features 
The creek descends  over the entire  course.

See also 

 List of rivers of New South Wales (L-Z)
 Rivers of New South Wales

References

External links
 

Rivers of New South Wales
Tributaries of the Lachlan River
Rivers in the Riverina